Mount Pleasant (or Mt. Pleasant) is a census-designated place and unincorporated community in northeastern Marshall County, Mississippi, United States, located along U.S. Route 72 at State Route 311.  Although unincorporated, it has a post office serving the nearby city of Holly Springs. The zip code is 38649. The community also has a volunteer fire department located on Boswell Road, and a K-12 school located off of US Highway 72.  Mount Pleasant is bordered by Cayce and Taska to the west, Holly Springs to the south, Slayden to the east, and Collierville, Tennessee to the north.

Professional baseball player Benn Karr was born in Mount Pleasant.

It was first named as a CDP in the 2020 Census which listed a population of 293.

Demographics

2020 census

Note: the US Census treats Hispanic/Latino as an ethnic category. This table excludes Latinos from the racial categories and assigns them to a separate category. Hispanics/Latinos can be of any race.

Notes

Unincorporated communities in Marshall County, Mississippi
Unincorporated communities in Mississippi
Census-designated places in Marshall County, Mississippi